Symbiotics is a collaborative album by Porter Ricks and Techno Animal, released on 2 November 1999 through Force Inc. Music Works.

Track listing

Personnel 
Musicians
Justin Broadrick – production
Thomas Köner – production
Kevin Martin – photography, design, production
Andy Mellwig – production
Additional musicians and production
Magus Designs – photography, design

References

External links 
 

1999 albums
Collaborative albums
Techno Animal albums